Prodotia crocata is a species of sea snail, a marine gastropod mollusk in the family Prodotiidae.

Description

Distribution
This species occurs in the Indian Ocean off the Mascarene Basin and Mauritius.

References

 Drivas, J.; Jay, M. (1987). Coquillages de La Réunion et de l'Île Maurice. Collection Les Beautés de la Nature. Delachaux et Niestlé: Neuchâtel. . 159 pp.
 Michel, C. (1988). Marine molluscs of Mauritius. Editions de l'Ocean Indien. Stanley, Rose Hill. Mauritius

External links

Prodotiidae
Gastropods described in 1846